XIII Century is a series of real-time tactics computer video games developed by Unicorn Studio and released in 2007.  The series consists of the titles XIII Century: Death or Glory, its stand-alone expansion XIII Century: Blood of Europe, and a XIII Century: Gold release, which combines the two titles. The games are similar in interface and game play to those of the Total War series but feature a more complex battle mechanism, in which results are calculated for each individual soldier in the units and the corps mechanics are more realistic. The units possess different grades of AI (called "Self Control"), which give them the capability to evaluate various battlefield situations: a low-Self Control unit demands more management by the player.

There are more than 80 factors considered in battle, including such dynamics as the terrain and the direction of attack, so victory depends more upon the correct use of units within specific environments than their relative strength.

The games' single-player campaigns are a series of thematic battles. It is also possible to play battles in "Battlefield" mode, in which victory is assigned on the basis of points, which are scored both by killing enemies and by occupying important locations. A map generator is present beginning in the 2.2.1 version, and permits the creation of random maps according to a number of selectable preferences.

References

External links
1C Publishing 

2007 video games
Real-time tactics video games
Windows-only games
Windows games
Video games developed in Ukraine
Video games set in the 13th century
Video games set in the Middle Ages